Mount Reinhardt is a mountain 1,020 m, with a spur descending northeast from it, standing at the northwest portal of Good Glacier where the latter flows into Ross Ice Shelf. Discovered by the United States Antarctic Service (USAS) on Flight C of February 29-March 1, 1940, and named by Advisory Committee on Antarctic Names (US-ACAN) for Commander Charles O. Reinhardt, U.S. Navy, engineer for U.S. Navy Operation Highjump (1946–47) and for Little America IV.
 

Mountains of the Ross Dependency
Dufek Coast